"Dancin' Fool" is a song by Frank Zappa from his 1979 album Sheik Yerbouti. It was the first of two singles released from the album, followed by the second single "Bobby Brown (Goes Down)." The song premiered on stage on the 30th of October 1977 (as can be heard on the Halloween '77 boxset released in 2017). Much like Zoot Allures' closing track "Disco Boy", it mocks the disco culture of the 1970s, but unlike "Disco Boy", the song directly focuses on the dancing aspect of the culture. Specifically, the character Zappa is singing as cannot help but dance, despite how awful he is at it. He refers to his dancing as "social suicide" and says, "The beat goes on and I'm so wrong." He mentions as part of the reason for his bad dancing that, "One of my legs is shorter than the other," a reference to a severe injury Zappa sustained at the Rainbow Theatre in 1971. "Dancin' Fool" charted at 45 on the U.S. charts, making it Zappa's 2nd highest charting single, behind his 1982 song, "Valley Girl". The song was nominated for the Grammy award for "Best Male Vocal", but did not win. It was included on Zappa's best of compilation, Strictly Commercial.

Saturday Night Live

On October 21, 1978, Zappa was a guest host and musician for the popular skit show, Saturday Night Live. After the episode, he was banned from the show for "being difficult". Many in the cast, save Laraine Newman and John Belushi, were standoffish the entire night. The songs he performed as musical guest were "Dancin' Fool", "The Meek Shall Inherit Nothing", and "Rollo". His performance on SNL was possibly where "Dancin' Fool" first got media attention.

Track list
7"
A."Dancin' Fool" - 3:45
B."Baby Snakes" - 2:02

U.S. 12" (MK-83)
A."Dancin' Fool" - 6:15
B."Dancin' Fool" - 6:15

References

Songs written by Frank Zappa
1979 songs
1979 singles
Frank Zappa songs
Satirical songs
Disco songs
Comedy rock songs
Songs about dancing
Song recordings produced by Frank Zappa
Songs about disco